Gang Tae-gu (born 25 January 1961) is a South Korean handball player. He competed in the men's tournament at the 1984 Summer Olympics.

References

1961 births
Living people
South Korean male handball players
Olympic handball players of South Korea
Handball players at the 1984 Summer Olympics
Place of birth missing (living people)
Asian Games medalists in handball
Handball players at the 1982 Asian Games
Asian Games bronze medalists for South Korea
Medalists at the 1982 Asian Games
20th-century South Korean people